Carlos Arias Navarro, 1st Marquis of Arias-Navarro (11 December 1908 – 27 November 1989) was one of the best-known Spanish politicians during the Francoist regime.

Arias Navarro was a moderate leader in the last phase of Francoism and the beginning of the transition to democracy. However, he had been a hardline politician and involved in the White Terror by signing thousands of death warrants during the dismantling of the Spanish Republic.

Early life
Arias Navarro was born in Madrid on 11 December 1908. He served in the Ministry of Justice since 1929 as attorney in Málaga and Madrid.

Francoist Spain

Arias was close to the right-wing sectors and joined the Francoist side during the Spanish Civil War. He was public prosecutor in the trials set up by the Francoists in Málaga after the conquest of the city. There, he earned the nickname the "Butcher of Málaga" (Carnicero de Málaga) for his role in the imposition of the death penalty to true or perceived sympathizers of the Republicans, In one of the harshest repressions following the Francoist victory, an estimated total of 17,000 people were summarily executed.

He married María de la Luz del Valle y Menéndez, without issue.

After serving in various positions, including Mayor of Madrid from 1965 to June 1973, Arias became Minister of Government (Minister of the Interior) in June 1973. After the assassination of Prime Minister (Presidente del Gobierno) Luis Carrero Blanco he was appointed his successor on 31 December 1973, a position he continued to hold after the death of Franco. Arias Navarro had the support of the Franco family, most notably Carmen Polo, and retained the post during the transition to democracy. However, the garroting of the Catalan anarchist Salvador Puig Antich in March 1974 had already shown his aversion to political liberalization, while other events, including the executions in September 1974, the organization of the Green March in November 1975 by King Hassan II of Morocco, and the illness and death of Franco (which Arias announced on television), displayed his weaknesses and further eroded his authority.

Franco's successor as head of state, King Juan Carlos I, continued his appointment, so that it was his government (which included Manuel Fraga Iribarne and José María de Areilza) that instituted the first reforms, however unwillingly. He tried to continue Franco's late policies, opposing any change. After a lengthy power struggle, Juan Carlos forced his resignation on 1 July 1976.

The next day, the King granted him the hereditary title of marqués de Arias Navarro (English: Marquis of Arias Navarro), together with the dignity Grande de España (English: Grandee of Spain). Since he had no heirs, his title became extinct after he died.

Arias was succeeded by Adolfo Suárez, named general secretary of the Francoist official party Movimiento Nacional in December 1975. In June 1977, during the first free general elections held since 1936, Arias joined the Alianza Popular, a right-wing party created by Manuel Fraga. He then led the Búnker group of hard-liners opposed to any reforms, along with the leader of the Francoist party Fuerza Nueva, Blas Piñar. Arias, however, never again occupied a relevant position in the later Spanish government.

Both left and extreme right attacked him, calling him by the nickname "The Old ".

Later years
In his first democratic election the party joined Popular Alliance (AP), led by Manuel Fraga, being senate candidate for Madrid, but was not elected. He died on 27 November 1989 when he was 80 years of age from an infarction, and was buried at Mingorrubio Cemetery in El Pardo. His wife died in 1997.

Spain and Portugal
According to the Spanish daily El País, files released by the US National Archives and Records Administration show that, following the left-wing Carnation Revolution coup in Portugal on 25 April 1974, Arias met with the United States Deputy Secretary of State Robert S. Ingersoll in March 1975 and offered to invade Portugal in order to stop the spread of communism. The report Ingersoll forwarded to the then-Secretary of State, Henry Kissinger, on 18 March, stated that "appropriate steps" were being taken to ensure that "the events in Portugal did not cross the border into Spain."

Ingersoll went on to add that Spain wanted Washington to support Spain in the event of war, precisely at a time when the US was renegotiating the status of its military bases, and Arias wanted Washington to support Spain's future membership of NATO.

References

External links

Prime Ministers of Spain
Mayors of Madrid
1908 births
1989 deaths
Grandees of Spain
FET y de las JONS politicians
Government ministers during the Francoist dictatorship